Emmalocera actinoleuca is a species of snout moth in the genus Emmalocera. It was described by George Hampson, in 1918. It is found in Sierra Leone.

References

Moths described in 1918
Emmalocera